Marenzelleria is a genus of annelids belonging to the family Spionidae.

The species of this genus are found in Europe, Russia and Northern America.

Species:
 Marenzelleria arctia (Chamberlin, 1920) 
 Marenzelleria bastropi Bick, 2005

References

Annelids